EF-hand and coiled-coil domain containing 1 is a protein that in humans is encoded by the EFCC1 gene.

References

Further reading 

 

Genes on human chromosome 3